Košúty (until 1899 ) is a village and municipality in Galanta District of  the Trnava Region of south-west Slovakia.

History 
In the 9th century, the territory of Košúty became part of the Kingdom of Hungary. In historical records the village was first mentioned in 1138.
After the Austro-Hungarian army disintegrated in November 1918, Czechoslovak troops occupied the area, later acknowledged internationally by the Treaty of Trianon. Between 1938 and 1945 Košúty once more  became part of Miklós Horthy's Hungary through the First Vienna Award. From 1945 until the Velvet Divorce, it was part of Czechoslovakia. Since then it has been part of Slovakia.

Geography 
The municipality lies at an elevation of 120 metres and covers an area of 14.73 km². It has a population of about 1476 people.

Genealogical resources

The records for genealogical research are available at the state archive "Statny Archiv in Bratislava, Slovakia"

 Roman Catholic church records (births/marriages/deaths): 1691-1920 (parish A)
 Lutheran church records (births/marriages/deaths): 1701-1896 (parish B)

See also
 List of municipalities and towns in Slovakia

References

External links 
 https://web.archive.org/web/20071217080336/http://www.statistics.sk/mosmis/eng/run.html
Surnames of living people in Kosuty

Villages and municipalities in Galanta District
Kossuth family
1138 establishments in Europe